Passion's Pathway is a 1924 American silent drama film directed by Bertram Bracken and starring Estelle Taylor,  Wilfred Lucas and Tully Marshall.

Synopsis
After bravely defending a Mexican mine from a sabotage attack, Hugh Kenyon finds himself fired by his employer on a trumped-up charge. Driven to desperation, he arms himself and heads to the mansion of his former boss demanding redress.

Cast
 Estelle Taylor as 	Dora Kenyon
 Jean Perry as Hugh Kenyon
 Wilfred Lucas as 	Richard Stanton
 Tully Marshall as Butler
 Snitz Edwards as 	Simpson
 Kate Price as 	Landlady
 Edward Kimball as 	John Deering
 Fred DeSilva as 	General 'Scorpio'
 Kenneth Gibson as	Atherton's Son
 Ben Deeley as 	Howard Atherton
 Margaret Landis

References

Bibliography
 Connelly, Robert B. The Silents: Silent Feature Films, 1910-36, Volume 40, Issue 2. December Press, 1998.
 Munden, Kenneth White. The American Film Institute Catalog of Motion Pictures Produced in the United States, Part 1. University of California Press, 1997.

External links
 

1924 films
1924 drama films
1920s English-language films
American silent feature films
Silent American drama films
American black-and-white films
Films directed by Bertram Bracken
Films set in Mexico
1920s American films